Doctor, Lawyer, Indian Chief is an album by Thunderbirds Are Now! The album was released by Action Driver Records on November 26, 2003.

Track listing
"KGB Phone Sexxx"
"Not Witherspoon, But Silverstone"
"Pink Motorcycle Helmet"
"Keep It on the Lo-Lo"
"Kitchen Orgy"
"TurboRattt"
"Your Mission Is an Intermission"
"Party A.R.M."
"Who Wants to Fight?"
"When It Comes to Elements, Hydrogen Is Titz"
"Top Secret Upskirt Camera"
"Babygirl, I Got Ten Kids (Let's Not Make It Eleven)"

References

External links
Thunderbirds are Now! official site
Action Driver Records

2003 albums
Thunderbirds Are Now! albums